Asombrosamente (Spanish for "amazingly" or "astonishingly") is a 2015 American television series produced and aired by Nat Geo Mundo. The series, starring Mexican musician Aleks Syntek is composed of 10 half-hour episodes that explains the brain's functioning in daily activities.

References

National Geographic (American TV channel) original programming
2015 American television series debuts
2015 American television series endings